Nosifeno (former name: Midongy Sud)is a town and commune in Madagascar. It belongs to the district of Midongy-Atsimo, which is a part of Atsimo-Atsinanana Region. There are 3881 inscribed voters in this commune. It is located at the Itomampy river.
From the coast and Vangaindrano it can be reached by the unpaved, secondary road T18 of 94 km in very bad state of conservation.

To this commune belong also the villages of:
Amboniasy
Ankarinoro, Nosifeno
Beharena, Nosifeno
Bekofafa
Manombo
Maroangaty
Milahila
Morondava, Nosifeno
Nanarena
Vohimanoro

References

Populated places in Atsimo-Atsinanana